The Kurgan constituency (No.108) is a Russian legislative constituency covering the entirety of Kurgan Oblast. In 1993-1995 Kurgan Oblast had two constituencies but lost one of them due to declining population.

Members elected

Election results

1993

|-
! colspan=2 style="background-color:#E9E9E9;text-align:left;vertical-align:top;" |Candidate
! style="background-color:#E9E9E9;text-align:left;vertical-align:top;" |Party
! style="background-color:#E9E9E9;text-align:right;" |Votes
! style="background-color:#E9E9E9;text-align:right;" |%
|-
|style="background-color:"|
|align=left|Nikolay Bezborodov
|align=left|Independent
|
|44.09%
|-
| colspan="5" style="background-color:#E9E9E9;"|
|- style="font-weight:bold"
| colspan="3" style="text-align:left;" | Total
| 
| 100%
|-
| colspan="5" style="background-color:#E9E9E9;"|
|- style="font-weight:bold"
| colspan="4" |Source:
|
|}

|-
! colspan=2 style="background-color:#E9E9E9;text-align:left;vertical-align:top;" |Candidate
! style="background-color:#E9E9E9;text-align:left;vertical-align:top;" |Party
! style="background-color:#E9E9E9;text-align:right;" |Votes
! style="background-color:#E9E9E9;text-align:right;" |%
|-
|style="background-color:"|
|align=left|Gennady Kalistratov
|align=left|Independent
|
|21.19%
|-
| colspan="5" style="background-color:#E9E9E9;"|
|- style="font-weight:bold"
| colspan="3" style="text-align:left;" | Total
| 
| 100%
|-
| colspan="5" style="background-color:#E9E9E9;"|
|- style="font-weight:bold"
| colspan="4" |Source:
|
|}

1995

|-
! colspan=2 style="background-color:#E9E9E9;text-align:left;vertical-align:top;" |Candidate
! style="background-color:#E9E9E9;text-align:left;vertical-align:top;" |Party
! style="background-color:#E9E9E9;text-align:right;" |Votes
! style="background-color:#E9E9E9;text-align:right;" |%
|-
|style="background-color:"|
|align=left|Nikolay Bezborodov (incumbent)
|align=left|Independent
|
|26.99%
|-
|style="background-color:"|
|align=left|Svetlana Mekhnina
|align=left|Our Home – Russia
|
|14.91%
|-
|style="background-color:"|
|align=left|Anatoly Ustyuzhanin
|align=left|Agrarian Party
|
|12.39%
|-
|style="background-color:"|
|align=left|Vladimir Usmanov
|align=left|Independent
|
|11.58%
|-
|style="background-color:"|
|align=left|Gennady Kalistratov (incumbent)
|align=left|Independent
|
|7.13%
|-
|style="background-color:"|
|align=left|Boris Moiseyev
|align=left|Liberal Democratic Party
|
|4.72%
|-
|style="background-color:#F21A29"|
|align=left|Mikhail Baskov
|align=left|Trade Unions and Industrialists – Union of Labour
|
|3.58%
|-
|style="background-color:#3A46CE"|
|align=left|Vladimir Yusov
|align=left|Democratic Choice of Russia – United Democrats
|
|3.41%
|-
|style="background-color:"|
|align=left|Vladimir Vasilyev
|align=left|Independent
|
|3.17%
|-
|style="background-color:"|
|align=left|Igor Shirmanov
|align=left|Party of Tax Cuts' Supporters
|
|2.07%
|-
|style="background-color:#000000"|
|colspan=2 |against all
|
|8.64%
|-
| colspan="5" style="background-color:#E9E9E9;"|
|- style="font-weight:bold"
| colspan="3" style="text-align:left;" | Total
| 
| 100%
|-
| colspan="5" style="background-color:#E9E9E9;"|
|- style="font-weight:bold"
| colspan="4" |Source:
|
|}

1999

|-
! colspan=2 style="background-color:#E9E9E9;text-align:left;vertical-align:top;" |Candidate
! style="background-color:#E9E9E9;text-align:left;vertical-align:top;" |Party
! style="background-color:#E9E9E9;text-align:right;" |Votes
! style="background-color:#E9E9E9;text-align:right;" |%
|-
|style="background-color:"|
|align=left|Nikolay Bezborodov (incumbent)
|align=left|Independent
|
|31.77%
|-
|style="background-color:"|
|align=left|Vladimir Usmanov
|align=left|Independent
|
|14.00%
|-
|style="background-color:"|
|align=left|Svetlana Mekhnina
|align=left|Independent
|
|11.58%
|-
|style="background-color:"|
|align=left|Aleksey Ivanov
|align=left|Yabloko
|
|9.13%
|-
|style="background-color:"|
|align=left|Nikolay Predein
|align=left|Independent
|
|6.54%
|-
|style="background-color:"|
|align=left|Viktor Tataurov
|align=left|Independent
|
|3.48%
|-
|style="background-color:"|
|align=left|Mikhail Shabanov
|align=left|Independent
|
|2.18%
|-
|style="background-color:#020266"|
|align=left|Vladimir Yusov
|align=left|Russian Socialist Party
|
|2.10%
|-
|style="background-color:"|
|align=left|Lyudmila Morycheva
|align=left|Independent
|
|2.10%
|-
|style="background-color:"|
|align=left|Sergey Chirin
|align=left|Independent
|
|1.90%
|-
|style="background-color:#FCCA19"|
|align=left|Dmitry Yurchenko
|align=left|Congress of Russian Communities-Yury Boldyrev Movement
|
|1.39%
|-
|style="background-color:#000000"|
|colspan=2 |against all
|
|11.73%
|-
| colspan="5" style="background-color:#E9E9E9;"|
|- style="font-weight:bold"
| colspan="3" style="text-align:left;" | Total
| 
| 100%
|-
| colspan="5" style="background-color:#E9E9E9;"|
|- style="font-weight:bold"
| colspan="4" |Source:
|
|}

2003

|-
! colspan=2 style="background-color:#E9E9E9;text-align:left;vertical-align:top;" |Candidate
! style="background-color:#E9E9E9;text-align:left;vertical-align:top;" |Party
! style="background-color:#E9E9E9;text-align:right;" |Votes
! style="background-color:#E9E9E9;text-align:right;" |%
|-
|style="background-color:"|
|align=left|Nikolay Bezborodov (incumbent)
|align=left|Independent
|
|27.04%
|-
|style="background-color:"|
|align=left|Vasily Kislitsyn
|align=left|Communist Party
|
|16.65%
|-
|style="background-color:"|
|align=left|Mikhail Aleksandrov
|align=left|Liberal Democratic Party
|
|14.20%
|-
|style="background-color:"|
|align=left|Vladimir Usmanov
|align=left|Independent
|
|10.61%
|-
|style="background-color:#00A1FF"|
|align=left|Valery Verevkin
|align=left|Party of Russia's Rebirth-Russian Party of Life
|
|6.66%
|-
|style="background-color:"|
|align=left|Aleksey Ivanov
|align=left|Yabloko
|
|4.35%
|-
|style="background-color:#164C8C"|
|align=left|Igor Shirokov
|align=left|United Russian Party Rus'
|
|1.46%
|-
|style="background-color:#000000"|
|colspan=2 |against all
|
|16.79%
|-
| colspan="5" style="background-color:#E9E9E9;"|
|- style="font-weight:bold"
| colspan="3" style="text-align:left;" | Total
| 
| 100%
|-
| colspan="5" style="background-color:#E9E9E9;"|
|- style="font-weight:bold"
| colspan="4" |Source:
|
|}

2016

|-
! colspan=2 style="background-color:#E9E9E9;text-align:left;vertical-align:top;" |Candidate
! style="background-color:#E9E9E9;text-align:leftt;vertical-align:top;" |Party
! style="background-color:#E9E9E9;text-align:right;" |Votes
! style="background-color:#E9E9E9;text-align:right;" |%
|-
| style="background-color: " |
|align=left|Aleksandr Iltyakov
|align=left|United Russia
|
|58.33%
|-
|style="background-color:"|
|align=left|Vasily Kislitsyn
|align=left|Communist Party
|
|14.97%
|-
|style="background-color:"|
|align=left|Yury Yarushin
|align=left|Liberal Democratic Party
|
|9.07%
|-
|style="background:"| 
|align=left|Andrey Ilchik
|align=left|A Just Russia
|
|7.24%
|-
|style="background:"| 
|align=left|Aleksandr Samoylov
|align=left|Patriots of Russia
|
|2.10%
|-
|style="background:"| 
|align=left|Anar Tugushev
|align=left|Communists of Russia
|
|1.67%
|-
|style="background:"| 
|align=left|Dmitry Feldsherov
|align=left|Yabloko
|
|1.34%
|-
|style="background-color:"|
|align=left|Viktor Sevostyanov
|align=left|The Greens
|
|1.34%
|-
|style="background-color: "|
|align=left|Andrey Yusupov
|align=left|Rodina
|
|1.30%
|-
| colspan="5" style="background-color:#E9E9E9;"|
|- style="font-weight:bold"
| colspan="3" style="text-align:left;" | Total
| 
| 100%
|-
| colspan="5" style="background-color:#E9E9E9;"|
|- style="font-weight:bold"
| colspan="4" |Source:
|
|}

2021

|-
! colspan=2 style="background-color:#E9E9E9;text-align:left;vertical-align:top;" |Candidate
! style="background-color:#E9E9E9;text-align:left;vertical-align:top;" |Party
! style="background-color:#E9E9E9;text-align:right;" |Votes
! style="background-color:#E9E9E9;text-align:right;" |%
|-
|style="background-color:"|
|align=left|Aleksandr Iltyakov (incumbent)
|align=left|United Russia
|
|37.58%
|-
|style="background-color:"|
|align=left|Viktor Zyryanov
|align=left|Communist Party
|
|19.09%
|-
|style="background-color:"|
|align=left|Yury Yarushin
|align=left|Liberal Democratic Party
|
|9.25%
|-
|style="background-color: " |
|align=left|Valery Derzhavin
|align=left|A Just Russia — For Truth
|
|8.75%
|-
|style="background-color: "|
|align=left|Sergey Rogov
|align=left|Party of Pensioners
|
|6.18%
|-
|style="background-color: "|
|align=left|Vladimir Sender
|align=left|New People
|
|4.86%
|-
|style="background-color: " |
|align=left|Vyacheslav Stepanov
|align=left|Communists of Russia
|
|3.82%
|-
|style="background-color: " |
|align=left|Yelena Panova
|align=left|Yabloko
|
|3.70%
|-
|style="background-color: " |
|align=left|Aleksandr Pridannikov
|align=left|Russian Party of Freedom and Justice
|
|2.61%
|-
| colspan="5" style="background-color:#E9E9E9;"|
|- style="font-weight:bold"
| colspan="3" style="text-align:left;" | Total
| 
| 100%
|-
| colspan="5" style="background-color:#E9E9E9;"|
|- style="font-weight:bold"
| colspan="4" |Source:
|
|}

Notes

References

Russian legislative constituencies
Politics of Kurgan Oblast